Velocity Girl was an American indie rock band formed in 1989 in College Park, Maryland, and active in the Washington, D.C., area. The band released three albums before splitting up in 1996.

History 
The band started as the duo of Kelly Riles and guitarist/singer Archie Moore (ex-Black Tambourine) in 1989 (the two having met at the University of Maryland), initially going under the name The Gotterdemocrats. They became Velocity Girl with the addition of Brian Nelson (ex-Big Jesus Trashcan, also of Black Tambourine), Jim Spellman (ex-High Back Chairs), and lead singer Bridget Cross (soon to join Unrest). The band took its name from a Primal Scream B-side which appeared on the C86 compilation album. Sarah Shannon joined to replace Cross after the release of the band's debut single "I Don't Care If You Go." Unlike some 1990s rock music that featured an abrasive vocal and instrumental style, Velocity Girl's sound, especially post-1993, was more melodic and typically featured "clean" (non-distorted) electric guitar sounds and two-part harmonies. The band described their influences as "the Rough Trade and Postcard labels and some of the early Creation bands."  However, on their first seven-inch records on Slumberland and Merge, as well as their first Sub Pop album, Copacetic, Velocity Girl were noted for their shoegaze influences. The band was noted for its love of releasing a steady stream of 7-inch vinyl singles. Slumberland Records was formed in 1989 by members of several D.C.-area bands, including Velocity Girl. They often featured female/male vocals, sometimes simultaneously, with Archie Moore providing the male vocals.

Velocity Girl toured frequently, releasing three full-length recordings on the Sub Pop label. Music videos were released for "Crazy Town," (1993),"Audrey's Eyes," (directed by Phil Harder) (1993) "Sorry Again," (1994) "I Can't Stop Smiling," (directed by Spike Jonze) (1994) and "Nothing" (1996).  The group disbanded in late 1996 after playing their last show "The Buzz Bakesale" in West Palm Beach, Florida. Shannon, Riles and Spellman reunited in a short-lived project called Starry Eyes, releasing one EP in 1998. Moore had already formed Heartworms before Velocity Girl split up, and later formed The Saturday People with Terry Banks of Tree Fort Angst.

Sarah Shannon went on to release her self-titled album in 2002. There was one Velocity Girl reunion show played at the Black Cat in Washington, DC on June 9, 2002.

Jim Spellman, now a noted CNN reporter, played guitar in now-defunct Washington, D.C. based power-pop band Julie Ocean.

Personnel 
 Archie Moore - guitar, bass, vocals
 Brian Nelson - guitar
 Kelly Riles - guitar, bass 
 Sarah Shannon - vocals
 Jim Spellman - drums
 Bridget Cross - vocals (1989–90)

Discography

LPs/CDs
 Copacetic (Sub Pop - SP 196; March 24, 1993)
 ¡Simpatico! (Sub Pop - SP 247; June 14, 1994)
 Gilded Stars and Zealous Hearts (Sub Pop - SP 340; March 12, 1996)

EPs
 Velocity Girl (reissued as The Horrible Truth EP and 6 Songs) CD EP (Slumberland Records - SLR 23; April 16, 1993)
 Sorry Again CD EP (tracks: "Sorry Again", "Marzipan", "Diamond Jubilee", "Labrador (remix)") (Sub Pop - SP 357; May 24, 1994)

Singles
 "I Don't Care If You Go"  b/w "Always" (Slumberland Records - DRYL 4, 1990) (featured Bridget Cross on vocals)
 "I Don't Care If You Go" b/w "Not At All" and "I Don't Care If You Go (acoustic version)" (Summershine - SHINE 006, 1990) (featured Bridget Cross on vocals)
 "My Forgotten Favorite"  b/w "Why Should I Be Nice To You?" (Slumberland Records - DRYL 10, 1991)
 "Crazy Town" b/w "Creepy" (Sub Pop - SP 179, Nov. 1992)
 "Crazy Town" b/w "Creepy" & "My Forgotten Favorite" (Sub Pop - SP 179, Nov. 1992) (12-inch)
 "Audrey's Eyes" b/w "Stupid Thing" (Sub Pop - SP112-228, 1993)
 "Sorry Again" b/w "Marzipan" (Sub Pop - SP 257, 1994)
 "I Can't Stop Smiling" b/w "Marzipan" (Sub Pop [Europe], 1994)
 "Your Silent Face" (a New Order cover) b/w "You're So Good To Me" (a Beach Boys cover) (Merge Records - MRG 061, 1994)
 "Seven Seas" b/w "Breaking Lines" (Heaven Records - HV 13, 1995)
 "Nothing" b/w "Anatomy Of A Gutless Wonder" (Sub Pop - SP 341, Feb. 1996)

Split releases
 "Clock" on What Kind Of Heaven Do You Want? comp. (bands: V.G., Black Tambourine, Powerderburns) (Slumberland Records - DRYL 1)
 "What You Say" on Screw 7-inch comp. (bands: V.G., Jawbox, Candy Machine, Geek) (Simple Machines - SMR 04, 1991)
 "Warm", "Crawl" (on split 7-inch with Tsunami) (Sub Pop - SP 137, 1992)
 "Merry Christmas, I Love You" on Season's Greetings 7-inch (Simple Machines - SMR 14, 1992)
 "Breaking Lines" (on split 7-inch with Chisel) (Shute Records - No. 8, 1997)

Appearances on various-artist compilations
 "Blackzilla (live)" on Pre-Moon Syndrome Post-Summer Of Noise (Simple Machines - SMR 03, Dec. 1990)
 "My Forgotten Favorite" on One Last Kiss (SpinArt Records - SPART 1, 1991)
 "Tales Of Brave Aphrodite" on Fortune Cookie Prize: A Tribute To Beat Happening (Simple Machines - SMR 07, 1991)
 "What You Say" on The Machines: 1990–1993 comp. (Simple Machines - SMR 19, 1994) [track from Screw EP]
 "Here Comes", "Always" and "Crazy Town" on John Peel Sub Pop Sessions (Sub Pop, 1994)
"Sorry Again" on CMJ New Music Monthly, Volume 13 (CMJ, 1994)
 "My Forgotten Favorite" on Clueless soundtrack CD (Capitol, 1995) Certified Platinum
 "Finest Hour" on That Virtua Feeling: Sub Pop And Sega Get Together (1995)
 "Same Old City" on Golden Jam: General Mills' Golden Grahams (EMI, 1996)
 "I Can't Stop Smiling" on Poptopia! Power Pop Classics of the '90s (Rhino, 1997)
 "It's All Right By Me" on Flirt (MP3-only release, 2006)

References

External links
Sub Pop's Velocity Girl page
Velocity Girl on TweeNet
Slumberland Records
Velocity Girl Vinyl Discography at Pette Discographies

Indie rock musical groups from Maryland
Musical groups established in 1989
Musical groups disestablished in 1996
Sub Pop artists
Slumberland Records artists